C/2015 G2 (MASTER) is a comet discovered April 7, 2015 by MASTER, the Mobile Astronomical System of the Telescope-Robots at the South African Astronomical Observatory (SAAO). It was the first comet discovered from South Africa in 35 years.

Discovery was confirmed April 10, 2015 by the Minor Planet Center. It was at magnitude 10.7 at discovery and by mid-May it had reached magnitude 6.0.

References

Non-periodic comets
C 2015 G2
20150407